The Shirley Jackson Awards are literary awards named after Shirley Jackson in recognition of her legacy in writing. These awards for outstanding achievement in the literature of psychological suspense, horror and dark fantasy are presented at Readercon, an annual conference on imaginative literature.

Writing in Salon in 2010, Laura Miller noted, "The awards are only 3 years old, but have already proved a fitting tribute to a writer who roamed freely over similar ground and has never quite gotten the respect she deserves."

Award-winners are selected by a jury of professional writers, editors, critics and academics, with input from a Board of Advisors. The awards are given for the best work published in the preceding calendar year in the following categories: Novel, Novella, Novelette, Short Story, Single-Author Collection and Edited Anthology.

The first annual Shirley Jackson Awards were presented July 20, 2007 at the Readercon Conference on Imaginative Literature in Burlington, Massachusetts. The jurors were John Langan, Sarah Langan, Paul G. Tremblay and F. Brett Cox, who now form the Board of Directors along with JoAnn Cox.

Winners

References

External links
Official site

Shirley Jackson Award
Shirley Jackson Award
Shirley Jackson Award
Shirley Jackson Award
Shirley Jackson Award
Shirley Jackson Award
Speculative fiction award-winning novellas
Shirley Jackson
2007 establishments in the United States
English-language literary awards